Judy Gumbo Albert, known as Judy Gumbo, (born June 25, 1943 in Toronto, Canada) is a Canadian-American activist. She was an original member of the Yippies, the Youth International Party, a 1960s counter culture and satirical anti-war group, along with fellow radicals Anita and Abbie Hoffman, Nancy Kurshan and Jerry Rubin, and husband Stew Albert Judy received her nickname, "Gumbo," from Black Panther Party leader Eldridge Cleaver. Cleaver first referred to her as "Mrs. Stew," finding her refusal to use her husband's surname unacceptable. When Judy objected, Cleaver nicknamed her Gumbo, because "Gumbo goes with Stew."

Gumbo arrived in Berkeley in the fall of 1967, and became involved with the activist community.  She worked at the 60’s underground newspaper, the Berkeley Barb and helped found the offshoot Berkeley Tribe. In Spring of 1968 she joined the Yippies in Chicago to run a Pig named Pigasus for President at the protests during the Democratic National Convention.  When she wrote a feminist piece for the Barb’s publisher Max Scherr, he made his feelings about women’s liberation clear when he titled it with a double entendre, "Why the Women are Revolting." She helped stage the People’s Park protests in Berkeley after Stew wrote the Barb article that initiated those protests.  She continued to advocate for women’s rights through W.I.T.C.H. (Women’s International Terrorist Conspiracy from Hell), a Yippie guerilla theater feminist group.

Gumbo was put under surveillance by the federal authorities.  In 1972, the FBI described her as "the most vicious, the most anti-American, the most anti-establishment, and the most dangerous to the internal security of the United States." In 1975, she discovered that a tracking device had been placed on her car.  Her home was broken into and a listening device was installed.  It was active for 8 days.  As a result, she was part of a lawsuit that successfully challenged warrantless wiretapping.

In 1970, while the war in Vietnam still raged, Judy and two other Yippie women visited the former North Vietnam. In 2013, Judy returned to a unified Vietnam to help celebrate the 40th anniversary of the Paris Peace Accords.

Gumbo married historian Arthur Eckstein in 2017.  She and Albert were married from 1977 until his death in 2006.   She was married to actor David Hemblen from 1966–1968, and David Dobkin, a co-founder of Berkeley Co-Housing, from 2008 until his death in 2014.

In May of 2022, Judy's new book Yippie Girl was published. Yippie Girl is a feminist memoir that offers an inside look at the radical social movements that shaped the 1960s. Readers join Judy in a journey of personal discovery as she leaves a broken marriage in 1968 and immerses herself in the thriving protest and radical democracy movements of Berkeley. She shares about the evolution of the Black Panther Party and the Yippie movement, including the leadership of the protests at the 1968 Chicago Convention and other areas of radical direct action. She also offers a candid look at her own personal evolution, finding herself and confronting the realities of sexism and inequality – even among her fellow activists. It is loaded with anecdotes and events that make for thrilling content on a panel or conversation.

References

External links
Yippiegirl.com - Judy Gumbo's Official Website
with Judy Gumbo Albert  by Stephen McKiernan, Binghamton University Libraries Center for the Study of the 1960s, April 13, 2010

Yippies
American feminists
1943 births
Living people